Hattie Big Sky is a children's historical novel by Kirby Larson, published in 2006. In 2007 the book was named a Newbery Honor book  and an American Library Association Best Book for Young Adults. Hattie Big Sky was also an Illinois Rebecca Caudill Award nominee.

Plot
The novel is set during World War I. Hattie Brooks, a sixteen-year-old orphan who has tired of being shuttled between relatives she hardly knows, receives a letter from an uncle who has recently died. He leaves her all of his land, and Hattie travels to his farm in Montana to start life as a homesteader. She has less than a year to prove herself capable of taking care of the land. In the book we learn about Hattie through her letters to her friend Charlie who is at war, and to her Uncle Holt. One difficulty Hattie faces is being called upon, as a loyal American, to shun her kind neighbors because of their German descent.

Critical reception 
According to Sharon Morrison in School Library Journal: "Larson's vivid descriptions of the harshness of the work and the extreme climates, and the strength that comes from true friendship, create a masterful picture of the homesteading experience and the people who persevered." Morrison also said "it was a heartwarming yet poignant story about homesteading in early-20th-century Montana." Kathleen Odean in Booklist praised Larson: "Writing in figurative language that draws on nature and domestic detail to infuse her story with the sounds, smells, and sights of the prairie, she created a richly textured novel full of memorable characters." Sally Miculek in Booklist describes the story as being "historical fiction at its best."

References

External links

Hattie Big Sky website
MotherDaughterBookClub.com interview with Kirby Larson

2006 American novels
2006 children's books
Children's historical novels
American historical novels
American children's books
Newbery Honor-winning works
Epistolary novels
Novels about orphans
Novels set in Montana
Fiction set in 1918